Anubhav Mohanty (born 24 December 1981) is an Indian actor, film producer, television personality and politician who is known for his work in Odia-Bengali language films.

Movie Career
Anubhav Mohanty started his career by first appearing in Odia music videos before debuting in the Odia cinema in the 2004 film I Love You opposite Namrata Thapa. He had two other releases the same year, Saathire and "Barsha My Darling". Afterwards, a number of his films such as Nei Jare Megha Mote (2008), Suna Chadhei Mo Rupa Chadhei (2009), Akashe Ki Ranga Lagila (2009), Abhimanyu (2009), Ama Bhitare Kichhi Achhi (2010), Diwana (2010), Kiese Dakuchhi Kouthi Mate (2011), Balunga Toka (2011), Something Something (2012), Matric Fail (2012), ACP Ranveer (2012), Mo Duniya Tu Hi Tu (2013), Haata Dhari Chaaluthaa (2013), Kehi Jane Bhala Lagere (2013), Something Something 2 (2014), Gapa Hele bi Sata (2015), Agastya (2016), Abhaya (2017), Kabula Barabula (2017), Prem Kumar: Salesman of the year (2018) were commercially successful.

In 2012, after the success of Balunga Toka, he created his own production house named Vishnupriyaa Arts & Graphics. The movie Something Something was the biggest hit of 2012. Anubhav made his debut in the Bengali film industry with the movie Saathi Amaar opposite Rachana Banerjee in a special appearance.
In 2019, Anubhav Mohanty starred in his most expensive Odia movie Biju Babu directed by Nila Madhab Panda, which didn't do well as expected at the box office due to some political controversy .

After 3 year he made his comeback in a TV reality show in Zee Sarthak. The show "Dadagiri" is almost run 3 months with a huge Trp. But Due to personal problems Anubhav Mohanty didn't continue this show for a long time.Now Anubhav Mohanty busy with 2 big budget movie "Love in London " & " Raavan ".

Political career
On 27 April 2013, he joined the regional political party BJD. He was elected to Rajya Sabha uncontested in June 2014 and is the youngest parliamentarian of Rajyasabha. On 23 May 2019, he was elected as the Member of Parliament from Kendrapara (Lok Sabha constituency) by beating the previously elected Member of Parliament Baijayant Panda.

Rajya Sabha

2014

Lok Sabha

2019

Filmography

 All films are in Odia, unless otherwise noted.

Awards and nominations

Other awards, nominations, and recognitions
 2004–05: Rajiv Gandhi Pratibha Samman
 2011: Chinta O Chetana National Award

References

External links

 
AnubhavMohanty
Best Movies of Anubhav Mohanty
 Anubhav Mohanty at Ollywood Maza
 Anubhav Mohanty Biography
 Anubhav Mohanty, one of the most successful actor in East India
Anubhav Mohanty Biography In Odia

1981 births
Living people
People from Cuttack
Rajya Sabha members from Odisha
India MPs 2019–present
People from Odisha
Male actors from Odisha
Male actors in Odia cinema
Male actors in Bengali cinema
21st-century Indian male actors
Indian actor-politicians
Lok Sabha members from Odisha
Biju Janata Dal politicians